Gymnocorymbus is a genus of small characins  from the Amazon, Paraguay, Orinoco, Courantyne, Gurupí and Parnaíba river basins in South America. These  tetras are popular in the aquarium trade.

Species
There are currently 4 recognized species in this genus:
 Gymnocorymbus bondi (Fowler, 1911)
 Gymnocorymbus flaviolimai Benine, B. F. de Melo, R. M. C. Castro & C. de Oliveira, 2015
 Gymnocorymbus ternetzi (Boulenger, 1895) (Black tetra)
 Gymnocorymbus thayeri C. H. Eigenmann, 1908 (False black tetra)

References

Characidae
Fish of South America
Taxa named by Carl H. Eigenmann